The 1987 UK & Ireland Greyhound Racing Year was the 61st year of greyhound racing in the United Kingdom and Ireland.

Roll of honour

Summary
The performances of Ballyregan Bob and Scurlogue Champ during the two previous years, combined with a strong UK economy resulted in a significant increase in greyhound racing popularity. The National Greyhound Racing Club (NGRC) released the annual returns, with totalisator turnover up nearly 20% at £77,832,636 and attendances up over 5% recorded at 4,020,438 from 5255 meetings. Track tote remained at 17.5% and a further boost to the industry came when the government abolished tote tax on 29 March. 

Major changes took place within the Greyhound Racing Association (GRA), the company merged with Wembley Stadium owners Arena Holdings to form a new company. The new company retained the GRA name and is valued at £68.5 million. In March the company closed Slough Stadium and six months later in September they closed Harringay Stadium which had been sold to Sainsbury's in 1985.

Satellite Information Services began to beam pictures into the betting shops from the 5 May, the company owned by the 'Big Four' Ladbrokes, Corals, William Hill and Mecca Bookmakers would pay the greyhound racing industry a fee for the televised rights. Ladbrokes however abstained from negotiations because they owned some of the tracks involved. Corals also owned some tracks involved but had the foresight to realise that they should pay a fee to help maintain the health of the industry. Ladbrokes actions only further enhanced the belief that bookmakers had too much control of the industry which was already subject to an investigation by the Office of Fair Trading. The negotiations ended with the NGRC charging £300 per each S.I.S meeting in addition to an extra 10% of the track's BAGS fee which prompts Ladbrokes to seek legal advice.

Tracks
Two more tracks closed along with Harringay and Slough, they were Clacton and Chester but four also opened, those of Barrow, Canterbury, Swaffham and Bideford.

Hall Green underwent refurbishment costing £400,000 and Powderhall's new grandstand was completed costing £750,000 but suffered a fire that then caused £25,000 damage. The Scottish Greyhound Derby rights, held by GRA meant that Edinburgh would hold the event for the first time leaving Glasgow with no classic race. Shawfield Greyhound Racing and Leisure Company Ltd re-opened the Shawfield despite not having the Scottish Derby as their blue riband event.

Competitions 
Harringay's closure resulted in the Oaks going to Wimbledon Stadium and the Pall Mall Stakes going to Oxford. The Scurry Gold Cup switched to Catford Stadium following the closure of Slough. Crayford took possession of the Golden Jacket after spells at Hall Green and Monmore. Harringay had also held the event in the afternoon and it was very popular due to the television exposure of the event. Crayford also provided a new matinee meeting for their own Ladbrokes betting shops. Role of Fame made amends for a disappointing TV Trophy performance at Oxford by winning the Cesarewitch at Belle Vue.

The Savva camp had a double success towards the latter part of the year. First with Olivers Wish (from the same litter as Westmead Move) who won the £5,000 Gold Collar. Then in the Laurels at Wimbledon, Flashy Sir beat a field that included Derby champion Signal Spark.

News
Trainers Ray Peacock and Linda Mullins joined Catford and Romford respectively from Harringay, Pam Heasman joined Wembley. Trainer Joe Booth died in hospital and George Curtis retired to be replaced by head man Bill Masters.  

The kennel of Gary Baggs contained Puppy Derby champion Spiral Darkie, in addition to Fifty Pence, Fiddlers Run, Signal Spark and Karens Champ. Signal Spark emerged as the star when winning the 1987 English Greyhound Derby. Signal Spark was then transferred to Ernie Gaskin following a well-documented dispute between Gary Baggs and owner Towfiq Al-Aali, resulting in the latter removing his dogs from the Walthamstow trainer. Fred Wiseman also had a strong kennel including Scurry champion Rapid Mover, head man John McGee was credited for much of the success from the kennel.  Signal Spark was voted Greyhound of the Year.

Principal UK races

Totalisator returns

The totalisator returns declared to the National Greyhound Racing Club for the year 1987 are listed below.

References 

Greyhound racing in the United Kingdom
Greyhound racing in the Republic of Ireland
UK and Ireland Greyhound Racing Year
UK and Ireland Greyhound Racing Year
UK and Ireland Greyhound Racing Year
UK and Ireland Greyhound Racing Year